Ma Ju-feng (16 March 1954 – 29 July 2018) was a Taiwanese actor.

Ma made his television debut in 1980, and won a Golden Bell Award for most promising newcomer the next year. In 2017, paralysis began affecting his extremities and Ma later suffered a stroke. While on vacation to Nantou County in July 2018, Ma was sent to Chu Shang Show Chwan Hospital  in Zhushan after collapsing in a bathroom. He died in hospital on 29 July 2018, aged 64. 

A day after his death, a coroner and prosector based in Nantou County determined that Ma had died of natural causes. Ma's funeral was held in his hometown of Keelung.

Ma was married, and had three children.

Selected filmography
The Spirits of Love (2006–2008)
Unique Flavor (2006–2007)
Feng Shui Family (2012–2014)

References

External links

1955 births
2018 deaths
20th-century Taiwanese male actors
21st-century Taiwanese male actors
Taiwanese male television actors
Male actors from Keelung
Deaths from cerebrovascular disease